Greg Chappell is a former international cricketer who represented Australia in 161 matches between 1970 and 1984. He was described by the cricket journalist Gideon Haigh as "the outstanding Australian batsman of his generation", while fellow journalist Christopher Martin-Jenkins said he was capable of "[mastering] even the best bowlers in the worst batting conditions." A right-handed top-order batsman, he scored 27 centuries (100 or more runs in a single innings) in international cricket – 24 in Test cricket and 3 in One Day Internationals (ODIs). He ranks 9th amongst Australian batsmen in terms of international centuries, and joint 41st overall, though he played fewer matches than all but Don Bradman above him.

Chappell played his first Test match in December 1970, and became the tenth Australian to score a century on Test debut, accumulating 108 runs against England in the second Test of the 1970–71 Ashes series. In 1974, he scored centuries in both innings of a match against New Zealand; his brother, Ian also achieved the feat in the match. In the first innings against New Zealand, Chappell recorded his highest score in Test cricket, 247 not out. He scored two centuries in a Test again late the following year against the West Indies, during his first match as captain of Australia. He scored three further double centuries in Test matches, two against Pakistan, and one against India, all in 1980 or 1981. During the fifth Test of the 1983–84 series against Pakistan, Chappell announced that he would retire at the end of the match; during the fourth day he scored his final century in international cricket. In doing so, Chappell became one of only four players to score centuries in both their first and last Test match.

In ODI cricket, Chappell made his debut in January 1971, but did not score his first century in the format until 1977, when his 125 not out helped Australia to chase down victory against England. His highest score in ODIs came in 1980, when he scored 138 not out against New Zealand, and he scored his third and final ODI century against the same opponents in 1982. Though he only scored three ODI centuries, he was the first player to score more than 2,000 runs in the format, and at the time of his retirement, he was the leading run-scorer in ODIs.

Key

Test centuries

One Day International centuries

Notes

References

External links
 
 

Chappell, Greg
Centuries, Chapell